Boy Darryl Deul (born 30 August 1987) is a Dutch professional footballer of Curaçaoan heritage.

Club career
He has previously played for Bayern Munich II, FC Volendam, Willem II and SC Veendam. In 2014, he joined FC Emmen.

He moved abroad to play for Ukrainian side Stal Kamianske in summer 2016. However, he did not receive five months salary because the club eventually went bankrupt.

In 2017, he moved to Cypriot club Pafos. On 16 August 2018, he left the Cypriot club and signed a contract for one season with Eerste Divisie club FC Volendam, returning to the club where he made his professional football debut.

References

External links
 Boy Deul at VI  
 
 
 

1987 births
Living people
Footballers from Amsterdam
Dutch people of Curaçao descent
Association football midfielders
Dutch footballers
Dutch Antillean footballers
Curaçao footballers
FC Volendam players
Willem II (football club) players
FC Bayern Munich II players
SC Veendam players
FC Emmen players
FC Stal Kamianske players
Eredivisie players
Eerste Divisie players
3. Liga players
Ukrainian Premier League players
Dutch expatriate footballers
Expatriate footballers in Germany
Expatriate footballers in Ukraine
Dutch expatriate sportspeople in Germany
Dutch expatriate sportspeople in Ukraine
C.V.V. Inter Willemstad players